The Girl Is Mine is a 1950 British drama film directed by Marjorie Deans and starring Patrick Macnee, Pamela Deeming and Lionel Murton.

Cast
 Patrick Macnee as Hugh Hurcombe  
 Pamela Deeming as Betty Marriott  
 Lionel Murton as James Rutt  
 Arthur Melton as Pringle  
 Richard Pearson as Sergeant  
 Ben Williams as Policeman  
 Leonard Sharp as Watchman

References

Bibliography
 Chibnall, Steve & McFarlane, Brian. The British 'B' Film. Palgrave MacMillan, 2009.

External links

1950 films
British drama films
1950 drama films
British black-and-white films
1950s English-language films
1950s British films